Twicelights World Tour was the first world tour by South Korean girl group Twice. It saw 25 concerts in 16 cities across various countries in Asia and North America, spanning from May 2019 to February 2020. Four encore shows in Seoul and Tokyo that were originally scheduled for early 2020 were cancelled following the outbreak of the COVID-19 pandemic.

Background 
On April 8, 2019, JYP Entertainment announced that Twice would hold their first world tour in 9 cities including Seoul, Bangkok, Manila, Los Angeles, and Chicago starting from May 25. On July 17, the 7 cities in Japan including Hokkaido, Chiba, and Osaka were adding to the tour schedule. Member Mina wasn't able to participate in Singapore, North American leg and Kuala Lumpur concerts due to her anxiety issues at the time.  On October 18, it was announced that Twice would hold additional concerts in Tokyo on March 3 and 4, 2020; additional concerts in Seoul for March 7 and 8 were added a month later. 

On February 24, 2020, JYP Entertainment announced that due to the impact of the COVID-19 pandemic in South Korea, the final shows in Seoul were cancelled; it was followed by the announcement of the cancellation of the Tokyo shows two days later.

Set lists

Tour dates

Cancelled dates

Boxscore

References 

2019 concert tours
Concert tours of Asia
Concert tours of Japan
Concert tours of North America
Concert tours of South Korea
Concert tours of the United States